Rafał Jackiewicz (born February 17, 1977) is a Polish professional boxer who fights in welterweight division. He is a former EBU welterweight  champion. His professional debut took place on 17 February 2001. Jackiewicz defeated Milan Smetana from Slovakia, winning by points after a four-round bout. His professional record includes 84 fights: 51 wins (22 knockouts), 30 losses and 3 draws.

On June 10, 2006 in Kędzierzyn-Koźle, Poland, Jackiewicz had a chance to win the International Boxing Council (IBC) welterweight title. After 12 rounds of boxing the Pole defeated Joel Sebastian Mayo by unanimous decision of the judges.

EBU Welterweight Champion
On September 14, 2008 in Kielce, Poland, Jackiewicz won the European Boxing Union (EBU) welterweight belt. The Pole defeated Jackson Osei Bonsu, who previously successfully defended the title four times. The scorecards were: 117:110 (judge Franco Ciminale), 114:113 (judge Michael Hook) and 116:112 (judge Robert Verwijs).

Jackiewicz vs. Zavec I
The first Jackiewicz’s defense of the title took place at Spodek Hall in Katowice, Poland. The Pole’s rival, Dejan Zavec lost for the first time in his professional career. Jackiewicz won by split decision. The scorecards were: 116:113 (judge Raiko Djajic and 115:114 (judge Michael Hook) for the Pole. Judge Sergio Silvi's type was 116:113 for Zavec.

Other fights for the EBU belt
On February 28, 2009 in Lublin, Poland, Jackiewicz retained his belt after unanimous decision over Luciano Abis. The Italian rival, similarly to Zavec, lost for the first time in his professional career.

On March 18, 2009 Jackiewicz resigned the EBU belt and started his preparations to the official IBF eliminator against Delvin Rodriguez. Both fighters came face-to-face on November 27, 2009 in Ełk. In general, the bout elapsed to Jackiewicz's dictation. However, he was hit powerfully in the sixth round and Rodriguez was close to finish him. The Pole landed on the canvas early in the sixth round but managed to continue the fight and won via unanimous decision. The scorecards were 117:116, 114:112, 115:112. Jackiewicz became the official IBF contender.

Before the championship bout, Jackiewicz defeated an average fighter from Turkey, Turgay Uzun in Strzelce Opolskie, Poland. The fight lacked spectacular moments but the Pole's advantage was unquestionable. According to judges, the Polish welterweight won each round.

Jackiewicz vs. Zavec II
The most important challenge of the Pole’s career was a fight for the IBF welterweight title which took place on September 4, 2010 Jackiewicz went to Ljubljana, Slovenia to face the champion, Dejan Zavec. After an average performance, Jackiewicz lost via points and suffered the first professional defeat. The fighter from Slovenia was more active and was dealing series of blows, contrary to Jackiewicz who limited himself to single punches. The Pole was able to gain slight advantage only in the sixth round and in the eighth one. The scorecards were 117:111 (judge Howard John Foster), 117:111 (judge Zdravko Milojevic) and 114:114 (judge Leszek Jankowiak).

Titles

Pro Boxing
2008-09 EBU welterweight European champion (2 title defences)
2006 IBC welterweight world champion (1 title defence)
2006 Polish International welterweight champion

Amateur Kickboxing
1996 W.A.K.O. European Championships in Belgrade, Yugoslavia  -69 kg (Light-Contact)

Professional boxing record 

| style="text-align:center;" colspan="8"|50 Wins (22 knockouts, 28 decisions),  25 Losses, 2 Draws
|-  style="text-align:center; background:#e3e3e3;"
|  style="border-style:none none solid solid; "|Res.
|  style="border-style:none none solid solid; "|Record
|  style="border-style:none none solid solid; "|Opponent
|  style="border-style:none none solid solid; "|Type
|  style="border-style:none none solid solid; "|Rd., Time
|  style="border-style:none none solid solid; "|Date
|  style="border-style:none none solid solid; "|Location
|  style="border-style:none none solid solid; "|Notes
|- align=center
|Win
|50-19-2
|align=left|  Aliaksandr Dzemka
| ||
|
|align=left|
|align=left|
|- align=center
|Loss
|49-19-2
|align=left| Robert Świerzbiński
| ||
|
|align=left|
|align=left|
|- align=center
|Loss
|49-18-2
|align=left| Ruben Diaz
| ||
|
|align=left|
|align=left|
|- align=center
|Win
|49-17-2
|align=left| Sebastian Skrzypczynski
| ||
|
|align=left|
|align=left|
|- align=center
|Loss
|48-17-2
|align=left| Patryk Szymański
| ||
|
|align=left|
|align=left|
|- align=center
|Loss
|48-16-2
|align=left| Bethuel Ushona
| ||
|
|align=left|
|align=left|
|- align=center
|Loss
|48-15-2
|align=left| Michal Syrowatka
| ||
|
|align=left|
|align=left|
|- align=center
|Win
|48-14-2
|align=left| Stiliyan Kostov
| ||
|
|align=left|
|align=left|
|- align=center
|Win
|47-14-2
|align=left| Michal Syrowatka
| ||
|
|align=left|
|align=left|
|- align=center
|Loss
|46-14-2
|align=left| Ionut Dan Ion
| ||
|
|align=left|
|align=left|
|- align=center
|Loss
| 46-13-2
|align=left|  Kamil Szeremeta
|||
|
|align=left|
|align=left|
|- align=center
| Lose
| 46-12-2
|align=left|  Gianluca Branco
|||
|
|align=left|
|align=left|
|- align=center
|Win
|46-11-2
|align=left|  Krzysztof Szot
|||
|
|align=left|
|align=left|
|- align=center
|Win
|45–11–2
|align=left|Filip Rzadek
|||
|
|align=left|
|align=left|
|- align=center
|Win
|44–11–2
|align=left| Lajos Munkacsi
|||
|
|align=left|
|align=left|
|- align=center
|Win
|43–11–2
|align=left| Michał Żeromski
|||
|
|align=left|
|align=left|
|- align=center
|Loss
|42–11–2
|align=left| Leonard Bundu
|||
|
|align=left|
|align=left|
|- align=center
|style="background:#abcdef;"|Draw
|42–10–2
|align=left| Rick Godding
|||
|
|align=left|
|align=left|
|- align=center
|Win
|42–10–1
|align=left| Luca Michael Pasqua
|||
|
|align=left|
|align=left|
|- align=center
|Win
|41–10–1
|align=left| Luciano Abis
|||
|
|align=left|
|align=left|
|- align=center
|Win
|40–10–1
|align=left| Farid El Houari
|||
|
|align=left|
|align=left|
|- align=center
|Win
|39–10–1
|align=left| Andre Deobald
|||
|
|align=left|
|align=left|
|- align=center
|Loss
|38–10–1
|align=left| Kell Brook
|||
|
|align=left|
|align=left|
|- align=center
|Win
|38–9–1
|align=left| Tarik Sahibeddine
|||
|
|align=left|
|align=left|
|- align=center
|Win
|37–9–1
|align=left| Ronny McField
|||
|
|align=left|
|align=left|
|- align=center
|Loss
|36–9–1
|align=left| Jan Zaveck
|||
|
|align=left|
|align=left|
|- align=center
|Win
|36–8–1
|align=left| Turgay Uzun
|||
|
|align=left|
|align=left|
|- align=center
|Win
|35–8–1
|align=left| Delvin Rodriguez
|||
|
|align=left|
|align=left|
|- align=center
|Win
|34–8–1
|align=left| Luciano Abis
|||
|
|align=left|
|align=left|
|- align=center
|Win
|33–8–1
|align=left| Jan Zaveck
|||
|
|align=left|
|align=left|
|- align=center
|Win
|32–8–1
|align=left| Jackson Osei Bonsu
|||
|
|align=left|
|align=left|
|- align=center
|Win
|31–8–1
|align=left| Laszlo Komjathi
|||
|
|align=left|
|align=left|
|- align=center
|Win
|30–8–1
|align=left| Deniss Aleksejevs
|||
|
|align=left|
|align=left|
|- align=center
|Win
|29–8–1
|align=left| Mircea Lurci
|||
|
|align=left|
|align=left|
|- align=center
|Win
|28–8–1
|align=left| Fabrice Colombel
|||
|
|align=left|
|align=left|
|- align=center
|Win
|27–8–1
|align=left| Juan Martinez
|||
|
|align=left|
|align=left|
|- align=center
|Win
|26–8–1
|align=left| Joel Mayo
|||
|
|align=left|
|align=left|
|- align=center
|Win
|25–8–1
|align=left| Arturs Jaskuls
|||
|
|align=left|
|align=left|
|- align=center
|Win
|24–8–1
|align=left| Sergejs SavrinovicsArturs Jaskuls
|||
|
|align=left|
|align=left|
|- align=center
|Win
|23–8–1
|align=left| Nicolas Guisset
|||
|
|align=left|
|align=left|
|- align=center
|Win
|22–8–1
|align=left| Joel Mayo
|||
|
|align=left|
|align=left|
|- align=center
|Win
|21–8–1
|align=left| Yuriy Tsybenko
|||
|
|align=left|
|align=left|
|- align=center
|Win
|20–8–1
|align=left| Siarhei Shnip
|||
|
|align=left|
|align=left|
|- align=center
|Win
|19–8–1
|align=left| Valeri Kharianau
|||
|
|align=left|
|align=left|
|- align=center
|Win
|18–8–1
|align=left| David Sarraille
|||
|
|align=left|
|align=left|
|- align=center
|Win
|17–8–1
|align=left| Joshua Smith
|||
|
|align=left|
|align=left|
|- align=center
|Win
|16–8–1
|align=left| Igor Krbusik
|||
|
|align=left|
|align=left|
|- align=center
|Loss
|15–8–1
|align=left| Giammario Grassellini
|||
|
|align=left|
|align=left|
|- align=center
|Win
|15–7–1
|align=left| Rozalin Nasibulin
|||
|
|align=left|
|align=left|
|- align=center
|Win
|14–7–1
|align=left| Eugen Stan
|||
|
|align=left|
|align=left|
|- align=center
|Win
|13–7–1
|align=left| Wojciech Konczalski
|||
|
|align=left|
|align=left|
|- align=center
|style="background:#abcdef;"|Draw
|12–7–1
|align=left| Slawomir Ziemlewicz
|||
|
|align=left|
|align=left|
|- align=center
|Loss
|12–7
|align=left| Ted Bami
|||
|
|align=left|
|align=left|
|- align=center
|Loss
|12–6
|align=left| Antonio Lauri
|||
|
|align=left|
|align=left|
|- align=center
|Loss
|12–5
|align=left| Michael Jennings
|||
|
|align=left|
|align=left|
|- align=center
|Win
|12–4
|align=left| Mariusz Biskupski 
|||
|
|align=left|
|align=left|
|- align=center
|Win
|11–4
|align=left| Karoly Domokos
|||
|
|align=left|
|align=left|
|- align=center
|Win
|10–4
|align=left| Virgil Meleg
|||
|
|align=left|
|align=left|
|- align=center
|Win
|9–4
|align=left| Vasile Herteg
|||
|
|align=left|
|align=left|
|- align=center
|Win
|8–4
|align=left| Allan Vester
|||
|
|align=left|
|align=left|
|- align=center
|Loss
|7–4
|align=left| Jacek Bielski
|||
|
|align=left|
|align=left|
|- align=center
|Loss
|7–3
|align=left| Malik Cherchari
|||
|
|align=left|
|align=left|
|- align=center
|Loss
|7–2
|align=left| Mariusz Biskupski
|||
|
|align=left|
|align=left|
|- align=center
|Win
|7–1
|align=left| Karl David
|||
|
|align=left|
|align=left|
|- align=center
|Win
|6–1
|align=left| Marek Kvocka
|||
|
|align=left|
|align=left|
|- align=center
|Win
|5–1
|align=left| Artur Atadzhanov
|||
|
|align=left|
|align=left|
|- align=center
|Loss
|4–1
|align=left| Yuriy Nuzhnenko
|||
|
|align=left|
|align=left|
|- align=center
|Win
|4–0
|align=left| Petr Rykala
|||
|
|align=left|
|align=left|
|- align=center
|Win
|3–0
|align=left| Zsolt Gyalog
|||
|
|align=left|
|align=left|
|- align=center
|Win
|2–0
|align=left| Attila Szabo
|||
|
|align=left|
|align=left|
|- align=center
|Win
|1–0
|align=left| Milan Smetana
|||
|
|align=left|
|align=left|
|- align=center

References

External links 

1977 births
Living people
Welterweight boxers
People from Mińsk Mazowiecki
Sportspeople from Masovian Voivodeship
Polish male boxers